Stachys rugosa is a species of perennial herb in the genus Stachys.

Distribution 
Stachys rugosa can be found in Southern Africa from Namibia and Namaqualand through the Karoo in Fynbos, Succulent Karoo and Nama Karoo regions, and into Lesotho. In South Africa, it can be found in the Cape Provinces and the Free State. In grassland biomes, it can be found at altitudes of 180-2900 m.

Conservation status 
Stachys rugosa is classified as Least Concern.

References

External links 
 
 

Flora of South Africa
Flora of the Cape Provinces
rugosa